The 1975 Bowling Green Falcons football team was an American football team that represented Bowling Green University in the Mid-American Conference (MAC) during the 1975 NCAA Division I football season. In their eighth season under head coach Don Nehlen, the Falcons compiled an 8–3 record (4–2 against MAC opponents), finished in fourth place in the MAC, and outscored their opponents by a combined total of 278 to 166.

The team's statistical leaders included Mark Miller with 1,252 passing yards, Dan Saleet with 1,114 rushing yards, and Dave Dudley with 338 receiving yards.

Schedule

References

Bowling Green
Bowling Green Falcons football seasons
Bowling Green Falcons football